Eric G. Fright (10 September 1917 – August 1995) was an English footballer who represented Great Britain at the 1948 Summer Olympics. Fright played amateur football for Bromley.

References

External links

1917 births
1995 deaths
English footballers
Bromley F.C. players
Footballers at the 1948 Summer Olympics
Olympic footballers of Great Britain
Association football midfielders